Hamad Sa'b (surname also spelled Saab or Sa'ab) (1891-1941) was an Arab nationalist rebel commander from Lebanon. He was born to a Druze family in Kahlouniyeh in the Chouf region of the Mutasarrifate of Mount Lebanon during the Ottoman era. He took part in the Great Syrian Revolt against French rule in 1925-27.

During the 1936-1939 Arab revolt in Palestine, Sa'b led a contingent of some 30 Lebanese volunteers, mostly Druze, to aid local rebels fighting against British rule and the growing Zionist movement. Sa'b and all of the volunteer contingents from the Arab world were under the overall command of Fawzi al-Qawuqji, a Syrian anti-colonialist rebel leader. Much of Sa'b's activity was centered in northern Palestine, particularly around the village of Bal'a, where his rebels fought a battle against British forces on 3 September 1936, in which two Druze volunteers were killed, including Mahmud Abu Yahya, a well-known rebel from the Great Syrian Revolt.

In 1941, Sa'b died fighting the British Army in Iraq. The vehicle he was traveling had been bombed by British forces, and according to local accounts, Sa'b died protecting al-Qawuqji who was also in the vehicle.

References

Bibliography

1891 births
1941 deaths
Lebanese Druze
Guerrillas killed in action
Military personnel killed in World War II
Lebanese Arab nationalists
People from Chouf District
People of the Great Syrian Revolt
Rebel commanders of the 1936–1939 Arab revolt in Palestine
Deaths by airstrike during World War II